Chak no 115/12.L (Kassowal) is a village of Chichawatni Tehsil in Sahiwal District, Punjab, Pakistan. The village is located at 30°29'14" North and 72°32'17" East. it is situated on the grand trunk road (G.T RD) at the lower end point of the Pakistan second artificial forest (the forest of chichawatni). Chak no 116/12.L (Kassowal) is 4 km away from Kassowal.

History 
Chak 116/12-L Kullyan Wala. This village found in 1911 and is very popular in all villages .It is one of the biggest villages of Tehsil Chichawatni.
There are 3 Numberdars Of The Village 
1st Belongs To Kullah Family
2nd Belongs To Syed Family
And 3rd Numberdar Belongs to Dab Family
It is popular due to its gardens of fruits. 
Ch Muhammad Zaman Kullah is the senior Numberdar of this village. He is also an EX-Nazim of UC # 74 as well as he was Chairman Of Market Commetie Kassowal

Recent Politics 
Son of the soil Syed Zahid Abbas Bukhari elected as Vice Chairman of current UC # 76 In local government elections 2015. He is young, enthusiastic and a new face of local politics. He has been elected counsellor twice. He is first ever politician of the Chak being elected for third time continuously.

Religion 
Islam is the major religion of the inhabitants of the village.

Demographics

Tribes 
Tribes of this village includes Syed, Balouch, Kullah, Malik, Dab, Arain, Rajput,BAJWA ,Mughal , Warraich,Cheena

Languages 
Punjabi,and Urdu are basic languages spoken in this village. Now new generation is also well conversant with English.

Economy 
The Major part of economy of this village depends on Fruit Farms 
The land is very fertile and rich in production of various crops such as wheat, sugarcane, cotton, and vegetables but unfortunately the underground water is heavy which is not useful for cultivation. People often keep buffaloes, cows, sheep, goats, hens, and ducks for milk, meat and eggs.

References

External links 

Populated places in Sahiwal District